Mansourian is a surname. Notable people with the surname include:

 Ali Reza Mansourian (born 1971), Iranian soccer player
 Arax Mansourian (born 1946), Armenian singer
 Elaheh Mansourian (born 1991), Iranian wushu athlete
 Tigran Mansourian (born 1939), Armenian musician and composer